Mia Farrow is an American actress whose career has spanned six decades. The daughter of actress Maureen O'Sullivan and director John Farrow, she had an uncredited appearance in John Paul Jones (1959) before making her feature debut in Guns at Batasi (1964), for which she earned a Golden Globe for New Star of the Year. From 1964 to 1966, she portrayed Allison MacKenzie on the dramatic television series Peyton Place.

Farrow subsequently earned critical and commercial recognition for her leading role in Roman Polanski's horror film Rosemary's Baby (1968), followed by further critical attention for her role opposite Dustin Hoffman in the drama John and Mary (1969). Throughout the 1970s, Farrow appeared in numerous stage productions abroad, and became the first American actress to join the Royal Shakespeare Company. She also appeared in film during this period, notably portraying Daisy Buchanan in Paramount Pictures' film adaptation of The Great Gatsby (1974). Beginning with 1982's A Midsummer Night's Sex Comedy, Farrow would spend much of the 1980s and early-1990s appearing in films directed by her then-partner Woody Allen, including The Purple Rose of Cairo (1985), Hannah and Her Sisters (1987), and Alice (1990), for each of which she received critical accolades.

Later credits include the 1999 independent film Coming Soon, the horror remake The Omen (2006), and the romantic comedy The Ex (2007). Farrow also provided voice work playing Daisy Suchot in Luc Besson's animated film Arthur and the Invisibles (2006), and reprised the role for its two sequels, Arthur and the Revenge of Maltazard (2009) and Arthur 3: The War of the Two Worlds (2010). She also had supporting roles in Michel Gondry's comedy Be Kind Rewind (2008), and Todd Solondz's Dark Horse (2011).

Film

Television

Stage

References

Sources

External links

Actress filmographies
American filmographies